Ghostbusters is a pinball machine designed by John Trudeau and released by Stern Pinball in June 2016. It is based on the Ghostbusters films of the same name.  Ernie Hudson provided custom speech and guides the player into becoming the latest member of the Ghostbusters team.

Overview
Stern created three versions; Pro, Premium and Limited Edition.  The Premium and Limited Edition models also feature an interactive ghost hologram target with animations, “para-normal” magnetic action slingshots, distinctive ramp architecture and additional custom molded toys.

The Limited Edition model is limited to 500 units and features a numbered plaque, custom themed backglass, cabinet artwork as well as a shaker motor and anti-reflection glass.

References

External links
 (2016 Stern Pro version)
 (2016 Stern Premium version)
 (2016 Stern Limited Edition version)

Pinball machines based on films
2016 pinball machines
Stern pinball machines
Ghostbusters games